Local elections were held in Turkey on April 18, 1999.

Results

Metropolitan municipality mayors

Mayor of other municipalities

References

External links
Results of the local elections (in Turkish)

Local elections in Turkey
Local
Local